Below is a list of Slovak language exonyms for towns and villages in the Vojvodina region of Serbia (Slovak names are in parentheses).

A
Ada (Ada)
Alibunar (Alibunar)
Apatin (Apatín)
Aradac (Aradáč, formerly also: Slovenský Aradáč)
Ašanja (Ašaňa)

B
Bač (Báč)
Bačka Palanka (Báčska Palanka)
Bačka Topola (Báčska Topola)
Bački Petrovac (Báčsky Petrovec, Petrovec)
Bajmok (Bajmok)
Bečej (Bečej)
Bela Crkva (Bela Crkva)
Belo Blato (Biele Blato)
Beočin (Beočín)
Bingula (Binguľa)
Boljevci (Boľovce)

C
Crepaja (Crepaja)

Č
Čelarevo (Čelárovo, formerly also: Číb, Číba)
Čerević (Čereviť)
Čoka (Čoka)

D
Dobanovci (Dobanovce)
Donji Tovarnik (Donji Tovarnik)

Đ
Đurđevo (Ďurdevo)

E
Erdevik (Erdevík)

F
Futog (Futok)

G
Gložan (Hložany)

H
Hajdučica (Hajdušica)

I
Inđija (India, Indjija)
Irig (Irig)

J
Janošik (Jánošík)
Jazak (Jazak)

K
Kanjiža (Kanjiža)
Kikinda (Kikinda)
Kisač (Kysáč)
Kovačica (Kovačica)
Kovin (Kovin)
Krčedin (Krčedín)
Kula (Kula)
Kulpin (Kulpín)
Kupinovo (Kupinovo)
Kuštilj (Kuštiľ)

L
Lalić (Laliť)
Lug (Lúg)

LJ
Ljuba (Ľuba)

M
Mali Iđoš (Mali Idjoš)
Melenci (Melenci)

N
Neradin (Neradin)
Neštin (Neštín)
Nova Crnja (Nova Crňa)
Novi Bečej (Nový Bečej)
Novi Kneževac (Nový Kneževac)
Novi Sad (Nový Sad)

O
Odžaci (Odžaci)
Opovo (Opovo)
Ostojićevo (Ostojitevo)

P
Padina (Padina)
Pančevo (Pančevo)
Pećinci (Petinci, Pečinci)
Petrovaradin (Petrovaradín)
Pivnice (Pivnice, Pivnica)
Plandište (Plandište)

R
Ruma (Ruma)

S
Sečanj (Sečaň)
Selenča (Selenča)
Senta (Senta)
Silbaš (Silbaš)
Slankamenački Vinogradi (Slankamenské Vinohrady)
Sombor (Sombor)
Srbobran (Srbobran)
Sremska Kamenica (Sriemska Kamenica, Kamenica)
Sremska Mitrovica (Sriemska Mitrovica)
Sremski Karlovci (Sriemski Karlovci)
Stara Bingula (Stará Binguľa)
Stara Pazova (Stará Pazova)
Subotica (Subotica, Sabatka)
Subotište (Subotište)
Susek (Súsek)

Š
Šid (Šíd)

T
Temerin (Temerín)
Titel (Títel)
Tovariševo (Tovariševo)

V
Višnjićevo (Višnitevo)
Vrbas (Vrbas)
Vršac (Vršac)

Z
Zrenjanin (Zreňanin)

Ž
Žabalj (Žabaľ)
Žitište (Žítište)

See also 
 Slovak exonyms
 List of European exonyms
 List of cities, towns and villages in Vojvodina

Vojvodina
Slovak language
Slovak
 Exonym
Slovak